Zhenxun was the last capital for the pre historical Chinese Xia dynasty. There is a consensus among many Chinese scholars that the Erlitou site about 20 km east of central Luoyang is identified as Zhenxun.

References

Ancient Chinese capitals